Blood Feud (and also known as Revenge) is a 1978 thriller film directed by Lina Wertmüller. The film's full name is Un fatto di sangue nel comune di Siculiana fra due uomini per causa di una vedova. Si sospettano moventi politici. Amore-Morte-Shimmy. Lugano belle. Tarantelle. Tarallucci e vino.. The film received a Guinness World Record for the film with the longest title.

Cast
 Sophia Loren as Titina Paterno
 Marcello Mastroianni as Rosario Maria Spallone
 Giancarlo Giannini as Nicola Sanmichele detto 'Nick'
 Turi Ferro as Vito Acicatena
 Mario Scarpetta as Tonino
 Antonella Murgia as Ragazza incinta
 Lucio Amelio as Dr. Crisafulli
 Maria Carrara as Donna Santa
 Isa Danieli as Una emigrante
 Guido Cerniglia as Segretario Communale
 Vittorio Baratti as Il farmacista
 Oreste Radi as Il maestro
 Tomas Arana as Fascist (uncredited)
 Tito Palma as Tutino (uncredited)

References

External links

1978 films
1970s Italian-language films
1970s thriller films
Films directed by Lina Wertmüller
Films set in the 1920s
Films set in Sicily
ITC Entertainment films
British thriller films
Italian thriller films
1970s British films
1970s Italian films